Aprakos is a kind of Gospel or Acts of the Apostles book, otherwise known as weekly or service Gospel (Acts). In aprakoses, the text is organized not in the natural order of books, but along with the weekly church readings starting from the Holy (Easter) Week as used in the Eastern Orthodox Church. In particular, the text of Aprakos-Gospels begins with the first chapter of Gospel according to John (In the beginning was the Word...), whereas regular Gospels (Tetra-Gospels) begin with the Gospel according to Matthew (The book of the generation of Jesus Christ, the son of David...). Many of the oldest Slavic manuscripts are aprakoses, like Codex Assemanius, Ostromir Gospels or Vukan's Gospel.

Similar books used in the Western Christianity (Catholic Church and others) are known as Lectionaries (the term of much broader meaning), or (Gospels only) as Evangeliarium or Evangelistarium.

External links 
 A discussion on the word "aprakos"

Eastern Orthodox liturgical books

ru:Апракос